Ramat HaNegev Regional Council is a regional council in the Negev desert in Israel. With around 8,000 residents spread across 20 villages, the council is geographically the largest in Israel, covering more than 20% of Israel's landmass. The council's headquarters are located on Highway 40 between Mashabei Sadeh and Tlalim.

Geography
Ramat HaNegev is geographically the largest local authority area in Israel, covering over 4.3 million dunam, around 22% of Israel. The region is home to around 8,000 residents spread across 20 villages split between kibbutzim, moshavim, community settlements, an educational youth village  and military bases, as well as 23 farms.

The council borders Central Arava Regional Council to the east, Hevel Eilot Regional Council to the south, Egypt to the west and Bnei Shimon Regional Council and Eshkol Regional Council to the north.  Neve Midbar Regional Council and the local councils of Mitzpe Ramon and Yeruham are enclaves within Ramat HaNegev.

History
The first Zionist pioneers who established Revivim in 1943 are considered the founding fathers of the region. Revivim was initially established as an agricultural experiment to study the land and climate to improve the working methods and increase production. In November 1947, kibbutz Halutza (the name later changed to its current name, Mashabei Sadeh) was established 10 kilometers northeast of Revivim. The two communities of Revivim and Mashabei Sadeh fought together to get a water pipeline, which would become the key lifelong that enabled the future expansion of the region's communities, such as Sde Boker, established in the early 1950s. While several other attempts were made to develop new Negev communities, they were eventually abandoned since they failed to receive the necessary funding as the region was not considered suitable for settlement.

The regional council of Ramat HaNegev was established in 1954 and included four communities in the beginning; Revivim, Mashabei Sadeh, Sde Boker and Kfar Yeruham (which became an independent council in 1959).

A fresh, vigorous movement to the Negev occurred in the early 1970s and accelerated following the Camp David agreements and the return of Sinai to Egypt. With the help of a campsite for temporary housing in the Mashabim junction, the first groups of settlers were able to move to the Negev, resettle, and establish new communities; Ashalim (1979), Tlalim (1980), Retamim (1983), Ezuz (1985), Nitzanei Sinai (1986) and Kmehin (1988).

Another wave began in the early 2000s when the Or Movement began directing mixed groups of religious and secular pioneers to the Negev. Merhav Am was established in 2001, Be'er Milka in 2006, and the new community of Retamim (abandoned by its original settlers) was repopulated in 2009. In 2012 the council approved the establishment of a new community, Ramat Tziporim, to provide homes for 2,000 Azzazmeh Bedouins living in the region. Sheizaf was officially recognized in 2020 by the authorities almost ten years of its initial founding.

Tourism
Ramat HaNegev has several tourist attractions, including the ruins of cities on the incense trade route such as Avdat, Shivta (a Unesco World Heritage Site), the Nabataean city of Nitzana, and Halutza. The region also includes the makhteshim craters (Gadol, Katan and Ramon)

Communities

Sister cities
  Boulder, Colorado, United States (since 2018)

See also
Ein Avdat
Nahal Zin fuel leak

References

External links
Official website

 
Regional councils in Israel
1954 establishments in Israel